"Stability 2008" was a major strategic military exercise initiated in late September 2008 involving the Russian military estimated to last for around one month. The exercise was a rehearsal of the deployment of Russia's conventional armed forces, and also its ground-, sea- and air-based nuclear deterrent.

The exercises involved mobilization and deployment to forward positions of forces in the Moscow and Far East Military Districts and the deployment of the navy in the North Sea, the Atlantic (Northern Fleet), the Baltic Sea (Baltic Fleet), and the Pacific (Pacific Fleet). Three air armies and one air defense corps, the Strategic Rocket Forces, strategic bombers, and Space Forces were involved as well as Belarusian military formations. The exercise involved all of Russia's nuclear forces, most of the battle-ready navy, and the Air Force, but only some of the army. Tupolev Tu-22M3; Tupolev Tu-95MS; and Tupolev Tu-160 strategic bombers, Sukhoi Su-27 fighters, Mikoyan MiG-31 interceptors, Ilyushin Il-78 tankers, and Beriev A-50 AWACS  took part in the exercise. On October 8, Japanese F-15s intercepted Russian Tupolev Tu-22M3s over the Sea of Japan.

As part of the exercise, two Tupolev Tu-160 strategic bombers were deployed to Venezuela.

Russian embedded journalists were on board the nuclear cruiser Pyotr Velikii which was underway to the Syrian port of Tartus, broadcasting daily bulletins from the exercise to Russian broadcast audiences. The Pyotr Velikii was destined for Venezuela where it took part in naval exercises.

See also
Able Archer 83

References

Military exercises involving Russia
2008 in military history
2008 in Russia